Stargazing is a studio album by Alpha. It was released on Don't Touch in 2003. It includes vocal contributions from Wendy Stubbs, Helen White, Martin Barnard, and Kelvin Swaybe.

In 2004, a special edition CD was released on Nettwerk Records with a different track listing.

Critical reception
Tim DiGravina of AllMusic gave the album 4.5 stars out of 5, saying: "While some of the group's contemporaries were releasing somewhat blundering, meandering albums, Alpha hit the ball out of the park with Stargazing and redefined intelligent and passionate electronic soul music." John Bergstrom of PopMatters called it "peaceful, intense and ultimately inspiring."

Track listing

Personnel
Credits adapted from the original edition's liner notes.

 Corin Dingley – production, mixing
 Andy Jenks – production, mixing, artwork
 Wendy Stubbs – vocals (2, 9, 12)
 Martin Barnard – vocals (3, 7, 14)
 Helen White – vocals (4, 8, 13), photography
 Kelvin Swaybe – vocals (5, 10)
 Pete Wild – piano (5, 12)
 Joe Allen – bass guitar (5, 12)
 Bob Locke – bass guitar (9)
 John Dent – mastering

Charts

References

External links
 

2003 albums
Alpha (band) albums
Nettwerk Records albums